Lydia Berkley Tague (January 5, 1868 – January 15, 1937) was an American jurist who served as a county judge in Eagle County, Colorado, from 1911 to 1924. On her appointment, she was described as the only woman county judge in the United States.

Personal life 
Lydia Berkley Tague was born in Boulder, Colorado, on January 5, 1868. She moved to Red Cliff at the age of 16 to live with her sister and brother-in-law. In 1889, she married Patrick Tague with whom she had five children. A Democrat and avid voter, Tague supported women's suffrage noting that "[women] can't do any worse with the ballot than men have done". She died January 15, 1937, at St. Luke's hospital in Montrose, Colorado, after a stroke.

Career 
Tague's husband served as a county judge in Eagle County until his death on February 2, 1911. Like her husband, Tague lacked legal education. She was nonetheless appointed to serve out the remainder of his term, after being approached by the county commission despite several male applicants. Tague was quickly dubbed "the common sense judge" by some members of the community. The Detroit Times described her as being the only woman county judge in the United States on her appointment. Tague was elected to the position the following year, serving until 1924 when she chose to not seek re-election. After stepping down from the bench, she clerked for Francis Eugene Bouck in the 5th district court until retiring due to poor health.

References 

1868 births
1937 deaths
20th-century American women judges
County judges in the United States
20th-century American judges
People from Boulder, Colorado